Strahinja Pavišić (Cyrillic: Страхиња Павишић; born 29 May 1996) is a Serbian footballer who currently plays for Fortuna Liga club MFK Tatran Liptovský Mikuláš.

Club career

MFK Zemplín Michalovce
Pavišić made his professional Slovak league debut for MFK Tatran Liptovský Mikuláš in a home fixture against FC Spartak Trnava on 11 February 2023.

References

External links
 MFK Tatran Liptovský Mikuláš profile 
 
 
 Futbalnet profile 

1996 births
Living people
Sportspeople from Belgrade
Serbian footballers
Association football midfielders
FK Sinđelić Beograd players
FK Radnički Sremska Mitrovica players
FC Samtredia players
FK Dubočica players
FC Telavi players
MFK Tatran Liptovský Mikuláš players
Serbian First League players
Erovnuli Liga 2 players
Erovnuli Liga players
Slovak Super Liga players
Serbian expatriate sportspeople in Georgia (country)
Expatriate footballers in Georgia (country)
Serbian expatriate sportspeople in Slovakia
Expatriate footballers in Slovakia